Speed Dancer is a 1999 Indian Telugu-language dance action film directed by Muppalaneni Shiva and produced by TVD Prasad. The film stars Raghava Lawrence and Monica Bedi. It was released on 18 June 1999.

Cast

 Raghava Lawrence as Seenu
 Monica Bedi as Monika
 Anand Babu
 Brahmanandam
 Kota Srinivasa Rao
 AVS
 Ranganath
 M. S. Narayana
 Ironleg Sastri
 Manorama
 Sangeeta
 Roja in a special appearance

Production
Raghava Lawrence revealed that he accepted the offer to appear as the lead actor of a film for the first time at the insistence of TVD Prasad. Monica Bedi also was given a role in the film, owing to her friendship with Prasad. The film's comedy track was written by Satish Vegesna.

Soundtrack

Release
Prior to the film's release, actor Chiranjeevi helped promote the film and spoke highly of Lawrence's work in the film. The film was released on 18 June 1999 and did not perform well at the box office.

References

External links
 

1990s Telugu-language films
1990s action drama films
1990s masala films
Indian action drama films
Indian dance films
Films scored by Ramesh Vinayakam
Films directed by Muppalaneni Shiva